Pennsylvania State Senate District 50 includes part of Lawrence County and all of Crawford County and Mercer County. It is currently represented by Republican Michele Brooks.

District profile
The district includes the following areas:

All of Crawford County

Lawrence County:

All of Mercer County

Senators

References

Pennsylvania Senate districts

Government of Crawford County, Pennsylvania
Government of Erie County, Pennsylvania
Government of Mercer County, Pennsylvania
Government of Warren County, Pennsylvania